Stan McGarvey (born May 7, 1949) is a former American football coach. He served as the head football coach at William Jewell College from 1978 to 1980 and again from 1987 to 1988, Austin College in 1983, Missouri Western State University from 1991 to 1996, and West Texas A&M University, from 1997 to 2001, compiling a career college football coaching record of 103–78–4. McGarvey won the NAIA Division II Coach of the Year award in 1980 at William Jewell. He is currently retired and resides in Hillsboro, Texas.

Head coaching record

College

References

1949 births
Living people
Cincinnati Bearcats football coaches
Illinois Fighting Illini football coaches
Missouri Western Griffons football coaches
Montreal Alouettes coaches
Sam Houston Bearkats football coaches
Tulsa Golden Hurricane football coaches
West Texas A&M Buffaloes football coaches
William Jewell Cardinals football coaches
William Jewell Cardinals football players
High school football coaches in Missouri
High school football coaches in Texas